Jefferson Township is one of twenty current townships in Boone County, Arkansas, USA. As of the 2010 census, its total population was 1,202.

Geography

Cities, towns, and villages
Valley Springs

Population history
The township was in Carroll County for the 1840 through 1860 censuses. The figures below include the incorporated town of Valley Springs.

References
 United States Census Bureau 2008 TIGER/Line Shapefiles
 United States Board on Geographic Names (GNIS)
 United States National Atlas

 Census 2010 U.S. Gazetteer Files: County Subdivisions in Arkansas

External links
 US-Counties.com
 City-Data.com

Townships in Boone County, Arkansas
Townships in Arkansas